The Las Vegas Desert Dogs are a lacrosse team based in Las Vegas, Nevada playing in the National Lacrosse League (NLL). The 2023 season is the inaugural season for the franchise and will play their home games in the Michelob Ultra Arena. They are owned by Brooklyn Nets owner Joe Tsai, former NHL player Wayne Gretzky, former NBA player Steve Nash and pro golfer Dustin Johnson. All games will be televised on MyLVTV and streamed on ESPN+.

The Head Coach and General Manager of the Desert Dogs is Shawn Williams. They hired Ken Millin as offensive coordinator and Rob Williams as defensive coordinator.

Final standings

Game log

Roster

Expansion Draft 
The expansion draft for the Las Vegas Desert Dogs was held on July 7, 2022. The Desert Dogs selected:

The following trades were made immediately following the draft:

 Las Vegas traded Riley Hutchcraft, Connor Fields and their 1st round Draft Pick (1st overall) in the 2022 Entry Draft to Rochester for Charlie Bertrand and their 1st round pick (2nd overall), 4th round pick (74th overall), 6th round pick (91st overall) in the 2022 Entry Draft and their 1st round selection in the 2023 Entry Draft
 Las Vegas traded Brett McIntyre back to Colorado for Sam Firth and Erik Turner
 Las Vegas traded Frank Scigliano back to San Diego for Mark Glicini, Brandon Clelland, their 2nd round pick (26th overall) in the 2022 Entry Draft and their 3rd round pick in the 2023 Entry Draft
 Las Vegas traded Jeff Cornwall to Calgary for Marshal King and their 1st round pick (18th overall) in the 2022 Entry Draft

Entry Draft 
The 2022 NLL Entry Draft took place on September 10, 2022. The Las Vegas Desert Dogs selected:

References 

Las Vegas Desert Dogs
Las Vegas Desert Dogs
Las Vegas Desert Dogs seasons